Hirsch Loeb Sabsovich (1860  1915) was a Russian-born Jewish American agronomist, chemist, agricultural educator,  Mayor of Woodbine, New Jersey, General Agent of the Baron de Hirsch Fund, and a leader of the Am Olam movement.

References

1860 births
1915 deaths
American people of Russian-Jewish descent
American educators
American agronomists
Mayors of places in New Jersey
People from Woodbine, New Jersey